Back to the Bible is an international Christian ministry based in Lincoln, Nebraska, United States.

History
Founded in 1939 by Theodore H. Epp on radio station KFOR (AM) in Lincoln, Nebraska, Back to the Bible expanded by supporting missionaries and broadcasting via shortwave radio to other countries. By the mid-1950s, it was being broadcast somewhere in the world in any given minute, and in 1954 the organization's first international Bible teaching ministry office opened in Canada. By the time of Epp's retirement in 1981, the Back to the Bible program was syndicated as a daily 30-minute broadcast on more than 800 radio stations worldwide.

Under Epp's direction, the broadcasts were also noted for music by the Back to the Bible Choir and quartet. Several popular phonograph recordings were made by the choir in the 1940s and 1950s. Back to the Bible also had a weekly youth program on Saturdays, featuring a youth choir and serialized adventures with a Christian theme, such as the Danny Orlis series written by Bernard Palmer. Both the music segments and youth program were discontinued in the 1980s. 

By the 1970s the organization had offices in Australia, Canada, Colombia, Costa Rica, Ecuador, England, France, India, Italy, Jamaica, Mexico, the Philippines, South Africa, Sri Lanka and Venezuela.

Warren W. Wiersbe, former pastor of Moody Church in Chicago, Illinois, served as leader of the Lincoln-based ministry between 1984 and 1989. He was followed by Woodrow Kroll.

2010s
Back to the Bible announced Woodrow Kroll's retirement in January 2013. Dr John Munro, senior pastor at Calvary Church in Charlotte, North Carolina, became the program's next Bible teacher and served from August 2013. In August 2014 he was removed from this position following a complaint from a member of his church staff; after investigation by the church he was reinstated as senior pastor, but Back to the Bible stood by its decision to dismiss him from his role there.

From August 2014 to June 2016, the daily Back to the Bible program featured Bible teaching from Warren Wiersbe, David Chadwick and Darrell Bock.

In July 2016, Ron Moore, pastor of The Bible Chapel in the Pittsburgh area, was named president and Bible teacher. He served as president until February 2018, and was succeeded by David Platt.

Back to the Bible ceased broadcasting on the radio in October 2020; it has continued to be produced as a podcast, with the ministry stating that brokered programming fees on most religious stations had made continuing to syndicate the program no longer viable.

Current situation
 Back to the Bible has offices in nine countries outside the United States (Canada, Ecuador, India, Indonesia, Jamaica, Japan, Nepal, Sri Lanka, Trinidad & Tobago) and broadcasts in multiple languages.

The charity has a 2-star rating from Charity Navigator, an independent evaluator of American charities.

Bible teachers

References

External links

Evangelicalism in Nebraska
Evangelical parachurch organizations
Organizations based in Lincoln, Nebraska
Culture of Lincoln, Nebraska
American Christian radio programs
1939 establishments in Nebraska
1939 radio programme debuts